The 2022 North America and Caribbean Men's Junior Handball Championship was the first edition of the tournament, it took place in Mexico City, Mexico, from 12 to 17 December 2022. It acted as the North America and Caribbean qualifying tournament for the 2023 Men's Junior World Handball Championship.

Preliminary round
All times are local (UTC–6).

Group A

Group B

Placement round

Knockout stage

Bracket

Semifinals

Third place game

Final

Final standings

References

North America and Caribbean Junior
International handball competitions hosted by Mexico
North America
Sports competitions in Mexico City
North America